Midway Presbyterian Church and Cemetery is a historic Presbyterian church at 4635 Dallas Highway/GA 120 SW in Powder Springs, Georgia.

The congregation was founded in 1850 with fourteen organizing members. The sanctuary was built in 1905 and was added to the National Register of Historic Places in 1986. It still stands in the church property. In 1987 a new much bigger sanctuary was built to accommodate the growing community. The church built a 1,200-seat sanctuary and a 700-seat chapel building because it had outgrown the former structure built in 1987.

The congregation is a member of the Presbyterian Church in America, and subscribes the Westminster Confession of Faith.

The senior pastor is presently Rev. David W. Hall.

References

External links 
 Official website
 

Presbyterian Church in America churches in Georgia
Protestant Reformed cemeteries
Churches on the National Register of Historic Places in Georgia (U.S. state)
Churches completed in 1905
Buildings and structures in Cobb County, Georgia
Cemeteries on the National Register of Historic Places in Georgia (U.S. state)
National Register of Historic Places in Cobb County, Georgia
1850 establishments in Georgia (U.S. state)